African Americans are a demographic minority in the United States. The first achievements by African Americans in various fields historically marked footholds, often leading to more widespread cultural change. The shorthand phrase for this is "breaking the color barrier".

The world of sports generally is invoked in the frequently cited example of Jackie Robinson, who became the first African American of the modern era to become a Major League Baseball player in 1947, ending 60 years of segregated Negro leagues.

19th century

1879 
 First African American to play major league baseball: Possibly William Edward White; he played as a substitute in one professional baseball game for the Providence Grays of the National League, on June 21, 1879. Work by the Society for American Baseball Research (SABR) suggests that he may have been the first African-American to play major league baseball, predating the longer careers of Moses Fleetwood Walker and his brother Weldy Walker by five years; and Jackie Robinson by 68 years.

1884 
 First African American to play professional baseball at the major-league level: Possibly Moses Fleetwood Walker, but see also William Edward White in 1879.

1896 
 First African American to compete in the U.S. Open Golf Championship: John Shippen. He was also the first American golf professional.

1899 

 First African American to win a gold medal at the Track Cycling World Championships: Major Taylor (Sprint). This also made him the first African American to achieve world championship in any sport.

20th century

1902 
First African American professional basketball player: Harry Lew (New England Professional Basketball League) (See also: 1950)
 First African-American professional American football player: Charles Follis
First African American boxing champion: Joe Gans, a lightweight

1904 

First African American to participate in the Olympic Games, and first to win a medal: George Poage (two bronze medals)

1908 

First African American heavyweight boxing champion: Jack Johnson
First African American Olympic gold medal winner: John Taylor (track and field medley relay team). (See also: DeHart Hubbard, 1924)

1910s

1916 
First African American football player to play in a Rose Bowl game: Fritz Pollard, Brown University

1917 
First African American woman to win a major sports title: Lucy Diggs Slowe, American Tennis Association

1920s

1920 
First African American NFL football players: Fritz Pollard (Akron Pros) and Bobby Marshall (Rock Island Independents)

1921
First African American NFL football coach:  Fritz Pollard, co-head coach, Akron Pros, while continuing to play running back

1924 
First African American to win individual Olympic gold medal: DeHart Hubbard (Long jump, 1924 Summer Olympics). (See also: John Taylor, 1908)

1929 
First African American sportscaster: Sherman "Jocko" Maxwell (WNJR, Newark, New Jersey)

1930s

1936
First African-American professional baseball player in Japan: Jimmy Bonner

1940s

1946
First African American to sign a contract with an NFL team in the modern (post-World War II) era: Kenny Washington

1947 
First African American Major League Baseball player of the modern era: Jackie Robinson (Brooklyn Dodgers). (See also: Moses Fleetwood Walker, 1884)
 First African-American Major League Baseball player in the American League: Larry Doby (Cleveland Indians).
First African American consensus college All-American basketball player: Don Barksdale

1948
First African American woman to win an Olympic gold medal: Alice Coachman
First African American on an Olympic basketball team and first African-American Olympic gold medal basketball winner: Don Barksdale, in the 1948 Summer Olympics
First African American to design and construct a professional golf course: Bill Powell

1949
First African American to win an MVP award in Major League Baseball: Jackie Robinson (Brooklyn Dodgers, National League) (See also: Elston Howard, 1963)

1950s

1950
First African American woman to compete on the world tennis tour: Althea Gibson
First African American NBA basketball players: Nat "Sweetwater" Clifton (New York Knicks), Chuck Cooper (Boston Celtics), and Earl Lloyd (Washington Capitols). Note: Harold Hunter was the first to sign an NBA contract, signing with the Washington Capitols on April 26, 1950. However, he was cut from the team during training camp and did not play professionally. (See also: 1902)

1951
First African American named to the College Football Hall of Fame: Duke Slater, University of Iowa (1918–1921)
First African American quarterback to become a regular starter for a professional football team: Bernie Custis (Hamilton Tiger-Cats)

1953 
First African American basketball player to play in the NBA All-Star Game: Don Barksdale in the 1953 NBA All-Star Game
First African American quarterback to play in the National Football League during the modern (post-World War II) era: Willie Thrower (Chicago Bears)

1955 
First African Americans to play in the Orange Bowl: Charles Bryant and Jon McWilliams (University of Nebraska)

1956
First African American to break the color barrier in the Sugar Bowl: Bobby Grier, (Pittsburgh Panthers in the 1956 Sugar Bowl)
First African American Wimbledon tennis champion: Althea Gibson (doubles, with Englishwoman Angela Buxton); also first African American to win a Grand Slam event (French Open). (See also: Arthur Ashe, 1968; Serena Williams, 2003)
First African American to win the Cy Young Award as the top pitcher in Major League Baseball, in the award's inaugural year: Don Newcombe (Brooklyn Dodgers)

1957 

 First African American NFL assistant coach (receivers coach) of the modern era: Lowell Perry (Pittsburgh Steelers) (See also: 1966)

1958 

Willie O'Ree debuts with the Boston Bruins in a game against the Montreal Canadiens, becoming the first Black player to play in the NHL. Willie would later be inducted into the Hockey Hall of Fame 60 years later

1960s

1961 
First African American to win the Heisman Trophy: Ernie Davis (Syracuse University)
First African American to join the PGA Tour: Charlie Sifford

1962 
First African American to be inducted into the Baseball Hall of Fame: Jackie Robinson (See also: Satchel Paige, 1971)
First African-American coach in Major League Baseball: John Jordan "Buck" O'Neil (Chicago Cubs)

1963
First African American to be named American League MVP: Elston Howard (New York Yankees) (See also: Jackie Robinson, 1949)
First African Americans inducted to the Basketball Hall of Fame: New York Renaissance, inducted as a team. (See also: Bob Douglas, 1972; Bill Russell, 1975; Clarence Gaines, 1982)
First African American to win a NASCAR Grand National event: Wendell Scott. See also 2015.

1964
First African-American baseball player to be named the Major League Baseball World Series MVP: Bob Gibson, St. Louis Cardinals
First African-American to join the Ladies Professional Golf Association: Althea Gibson

1966
First African-American coach in the National Basketball Association: Bill Russell (Boston Celtics)
First African-American Major League Baseball umpire: Emmett Ashford
First African-American NFL broadcaster: Lowell Perry (CBS, on Pittsburgh Steelers games) (See also: 1957)
First team with 5 African American starters to win the NCAA basketball tournament: 1965–66 Texas Western Miners basketball team

1967
First African American to win a PGA Tour event: Charlie Sifford (1967 Greater Hartford Open Invitational)
First African American to be inducted into the Pro Football Hall of Fame: Emlen Tunnell

1968
First African-American man to win a Grand Slam tennis event: Arthur Ashe (US Open) (See also: Althea Gibson, 1956; Serena Williams, 2003)
First African American to start at quarterback in the modern era of professional football: Marlin Briscoe (Denver Broncos, AFL)
First African-American coach to win NBA Championship: Bill Russell

1970s

1970
First African-American basketball player to win the NBA All Star MVP, the NBA Finals MVP, and the NBA MVP all in the same season: Willis Reed (New York Knicks)
First African-American NCAA Division I basketball coach: Will Robinson (Illinois State University)
First African American to initiate the concept of free agency. He refused to accept a trade following the 1969 season, ultimately appealing his case to the U.S. Supreme Court. The trend of free agency expanded across the entire landscape of professional sports for all races and all cultures: Curt Flood (St. Louis Cardinals)

1972 
First African-American National Basketball Association general manager: Wayne Embry
First African American inducted to the Basketball Hall of Fame: Team-owner and coach Bob Douglas, in the category of "contributor" (See also: New York Renaissance, 1963; player Bill Russell, 1975; coach Clarence Gaines, 1982)

1974 
First African-American NBA Coach of the Year: Ray Scott (Detroit Pistons)

1975
First African American inducted to the Basketball Hall of Fame as a player: Bill Russell (See also: Harlem Renaissance, 1963; Bob Douglas, 1972; Clarence Gaines, 1982)
First African-American manager in Major League Baseball: Frank Robinson (Cleveland Indians)
First African American to play in a men's major golf championship: Lee Elder (The Masters)
First African American to be named Super Bowl MVP in NFL: Franco Harris (Pittsburgh Steelers). Of mixed heritage, Harris was also first Italian American to win the award.

1977 
First African-American Major League Baseball general manager: Bill Lucas (Atlanta Braves)

1979
First African-American head football coach in Division I-A: Willie Jeffries (Wichita State)

1980s

1981 
First African American to play in the NHL: Val James (Buffalo Sabres)

1982 
First African American inducted to the Basketball Hall of Fame as a coach: Clarence Gaines (See also: New York Renaissance, 1963; Bob Douglas, 1972; Bill Russell, 1975)

1984 
First African-American coach to win the NCAA Men's Division I Basketball Championship: John Thompson (Georgetown)

1986 
First African-American Formula One racecar driver: Willy T. Ribbs (See also: Ribbs, 1991)

1987
 First African American man to sail around the world solo: Teddy Seymour (See also: 1992)

1988
First African-American NFL referee: Johnny Grier
First African American to win a medal at the Winter Olympics (a bronze in figure skating): Debi Thomas
First African-American quarterback to start (and win) in the Super Bowl: Doug Williams

1989 
First African-American NFL head coach of the modern era: Art Shell, Los Angeles Raiders

1990s

1991 
First African American to qualify for the Indianapolis 500 auto race: Willy T. Ribbs (See also: Ribbs, 1986)

1992
First African-American Major League Baseball manager to reach (and win) the World Series: Cito Gaston (Toronto Blue Jays) 1992 World Series
First African American to sail solo around the world following the Age of Sail route around the southern tips of South America (Cape Horn) and Africa (Cape of Good Hope), avoiding the Panama and Suez Canals: Bill Pinkney (See also: 1987)

1993
First African-American to serve as home plate umpire for World Series game: Charlie Williams for Game 4 of the 1993 World Series

1994 
First African American to win the United States Amateur Championship: Tiger Woods

1996
First African-American MLB general manager to win the World Series: Bob Watson (New York Yankees), 1996 World Series

1997 
First African American to win a men's major golf championship: Tiger Woods (The Masters)
First African-American UFC champion: Maurice Smith

1998
First African American to play in the Presidents Cup: Tiger Woods

21st century

2002 

First African-American Winter Olympic gold medal winner: Vonetta Flowers (two-woman bobsleigh). (See also: Shani Davis, 2006)
First African American to become majority owner of a U.S. major sports league team: Robert L. Johnson (Charlotte Bobcats, NBA) (see also 2001)
First African American to hold the #1 rank in tennis: Venus Williams
First African American to hold the year-end #1 rank in tennis: Serena Williams
First African American to be named year-end world champion by the International Tennis Federation: Serena Williams
First African-American Arena Football League head coach to win ArenaBowl: Darren Arbet (San Jose SaberCats), ArenaBowl XVI
First African-American general manager in the National Football League: Ozzie Newsome (Baltimore Ravens)

2003 

First African American to win a Career Grand Slam in tennis: Serena Williams (See also: Althea Gibson, 1956; Arthur Ashe, 1968)

2004 
First African-American NBA general manager to win the NBA Finals: Joe Dumars (Detroit Pistons), 2004 NBA Finals
First African-American Canadian Football League head coach to reach (and win) the Grey Cup: Pinball Clemons (Toronto Argonauts), 92nd Grey Cup
First African-American inducted into the World Golf Hall of Fame: Charlie Sifford
First African-American to play for USA Softball during the Olympics: Natasha Watley

2006 

First African-American individual Winter Olympic gold medal winner: Shani Davis (men's 1,000 meter speed skating) (See also: Vonetta Flowers, 2002)

2007 

First African-American NFL head coaches to reach the Super Bowl: Lovie Smith and Tony Dungy, Super Bowl XLI
First African-American NFL head coach to win the Super Bowl: Tony Dungy (Indianapolis Colts), Super Bowl XLI

2008 

First African American to referee a Super Bowl game: Mike Carey (Super Bowl XLII)
First African-American NFL general manager to win the Super Bowl: Jerry Reese (New York Giants), Super Bowl XLII

2009 

First African-American doubles team to be named year-end world champion by the International Tennis Federation: Serena and Venus Williams

2010s

2010
First African-American to win the Stanley Cup: Dustin Byfuglien with the  Chicago Blackhawks

2012
First African-American gymnast to win the women's artistic individual all-around at the Olympic Games: Gabby Douglas

2013
First African American gymnast to win the women's artistic individual all-around at the World Artistic Gymnastics Championships: Simone Biles

2014
First African-American player named to the USA Curtis Cup Team: Mariah Stackhouse

2015
First African American to be inducted into the NASCAR Hall of Fame: Wendell Scott
First African-American commissioner of a major North American sports league: Jeffrey Orridge, Canadian Football League

2018
First African American to play for Team USA Hockey in the Olympic Games: Jordan Greenway

2020
 First African-American president of an NFL team: Jason Wright with the Washington Football Team
 First African-American NHL play-by-play broadcaster: Everett Fitzhugh with Seattle Kraken
 First African-American NHL Assistant General Manager: Brett Petersen with Florida Panthers

2021
 First full-time female African-American NFL coach: Jennifer King with the Washington Football Team
First female African-American NFL referee: Maia Chaka

2022
 First African-American manager to win 2000 MLB games: Dusty Baker
 First African-American general manager of an NHL team: Mike Grier with San Jose Sharks

See also
Race and sports
List of coaches of Asian heritage in sports leagues in the United States

Notes

References

Bibliography

African-American
African-American firsts
African-American sports history
United States history timelines